The 36th Blue Dragon Film Awards ceremony was held on November 26, 2015 at Kyung Hee University's Peace Palace Hall in Seoul. It was broadcast on SBS and hosted by Kim Hye-soo and Yoo Jun-sang.

Nominations and winners
Complete list of nominees and winners

(Winners denoted in bold)

References

2015 film awards
Blue Dragon Film Awards
Blue